Laciempista is a genus of snout moths. It was described by Roesler in 1975, and contains the species L. amseli. It is found in China.

References

Phycitinae
Monotypic moth genera